Eucalyptus dives, commonly known as the broad-leaved peppermint or blue peppermint, is a species of tree that is endemic to south-eastern Australia. It has rough, finely fibrous bark on the trunk and larger branches, smooth bark above, lance-shaped or curved adult leaves, flower buds in groups of eleven or more, white flowers and cup-shaped, hemispherical or conical fruit.

Description
The bark on the trunk and larger branches is rough, finely fibrous and greyish and smooth grey on the thinner branches. Flowering occurs from September to January and the flowers are white.

Taxonomy and naming
Eucalyptus dives was first formally described in 1843 by Johannes Conrad Schauer and the description was published in Walpers' book Repertorium Botanices Systematicae (Volume 2). The specific epithet (dives) is a Latin word meaning "rich" referring to the rich oil content of the leaves.

Distribution and habitat
Broad-leaved peppermint usually grows in poor, dryish soils in open forest and woodland, usually in poor, shallow, stony soils in higher places. It is found in New South Wales south from Niangala in New South Wales and in south-eastern Victoria.

Uses

Essential oils
This eucalypt is a source of Eucalyptus oil and yields up to 12.75% by weight of partly dried leaves. Some forms of E. dives contain mostly the essential oils phellandrene and piperitone,  some also contain eucalyptol and the remainder eucalyptol, terpineol, geraniol and citral.

In the early post-war years there was a shortage of menthol and several manufacturers were able to produce this oil from piperitone but gradually this method was displaced by production of the oil from Mentha arvensis. The form rich in cineole is still harvested in New South Wales while the seeds imported into Africa are mostly from the piperitone/phellandrene form.

References

 Boland, et al., Eucalyptus Leaf Oils - Use, Chemistry, Distillation and Marketing, .

Bushfood
dives
Flora of the Australian Capital Territory
Flora of New South Wales
Flora of Victoria (Australia)
Myrtales of Australia
Trees of Australia
Plants described in 1843
Taxa named by Johannes Conrad Schauer